During the Korean War, Operation Bluehearts was the American amphibious landing conducted at Pohang on 18 July 1950 by the First Cavalry Division. The town was still in friendly hands, but was in the path of the rapid North Korean advance. The American units quickly joined the defenders. 

This landing, planned on extremely short notice, attracted little attention at the time, but pointed the way towards critical landing at Inchon (Operation Chromite).

Battles and operations of the Korean War in 1950  
Blue Hearts
Blue Hearts
Battles of the Korean War involving South Korea 
History of North Gyeongsang Province
1950 in military history
July 1950 events in Asia